Quarteto Novo was a group formed in São Paulo, Brazil in 1966 which released one landmark instrumental album and launched the careers of some of the band's members.  The eponymous 1967 album has been influential in jazz and pop music.

Originally named Trio Novo, the group consisted of Theo de Barros (bass and guitar); Heraldo do Monte (Viola caipira and guitar) and Airto Moreira (percussion). The group was created to accompany singer/songwriter Geraldo Vandré in concert and on recordings.  With the arrival of flutist Hermeto Pascoal, the group was renamed Quarteto Novo.  In 1967 the group recorded their only album, Quarteto Novo (Odeon Records).

In that same year, the band backed Edu Lobo on the live performance of Ponteio, which won "Best Song" at the 3rd Festival de Música Popular Brasileira (MPB).  Quarteto Novo's album won the prize for "Best Televised Recording by a Musical Group" (Troféu Imprensa) in 1967 and the Troféu Roquette Pinto.

The band toured Brazil backing Vandré on his 1968 album Canto Geral.  The group disbanded in 1969.  EMI Music Brasil released a CD  in 2002 and a vinyl LP reissue  in 2003, and EMI a European CD  in 2008.

All the band members come from the northeastern part of Brazil which is known for its regional baião music style, except Airto Moreira, who is from the south of Brazil. The album was instrumental in bringing baião to a national and then international audience.  Although the style is not well known outside Brazil, the album has influenced a host of popular songwriters in America, the UK, and Europe who had various hit songs using elements of baião style.

Discography
1967: ''Quarteto Novo''

References

External Links
 

Musical quartets
Brazilian musical groups
Música popular brasileira musical groups
Brazilian jazz ensembles
Jazz albums by Brazilian artists
Musical groups established in 1966
Musical groups disestablished in 1969
1966 establishments in Brazil
1969 disestablishments in Brazil